The Limelight was the name of a chain of nightclubs owned and operated by Peter Gatien. It had locations in New York City, Chicago, Atlanta, London and Hallandale, Florida.

Context 

During the 1980s, club culture had died down because of the AIDS epidemic and there were more regulations put into place in order to stop the spread. The music scene began to shift and the rockstar lifestyle had started to die down; bands like The Ramones and Blondie slowly sank into plastic commercialization. The artistic era also declined with the death of Andy Warhol. However, in the 90s, after more information was known about HIV/AIDS, people started to return to a club state of mind. In 1989, MDMA otherwise known as ecstasy, became a popular drug amongst the club scene. It heightened sensory perceptions which enhanced the experience of rave disco sounds and atmosphere. After the implementation of Rudolph Giuliani as the new mayor of NYC, the police cracked down on everything in order to fix the city's problems like prostitution, drug dealing, etc.

History

Florida and Atlanta locations
Peter Gatien opened the first Limelight nightclub in Hallandale, Florida, in the 1970s. Following a devastating fire in the late 1970s, Gatien chose Atlanta for his next incarnation of the club. The Atlanta Limelight opened in February 1980.  It was housed in a strip mall at the former site of the Harlequin Dinner Theatre.

The Limelight in Atlanta was a high-profile Euro-style night club designed and built in partnership with a certain Guy Larente from Montreal, Quebec who helped in the build of the Limelight series. The Limelight in Atlanta hosted many notables and celebrities over the years. A single photo taken in June 1981 skyrocketed the focus on the club, when celebrity photographer Guy D'Alema captured an image of Anita Bryant dancing the night away with evangelist Russ McGraw (known in gay communities as an activist). Several hundred newspapers and magazines ran the photo with the headline “Anita Upset Over Disco Photo”. Peter Gatien relished the publicity. The club hosted many Interview Magazine events which brought names like Andy Warhol, Grace Jones, Debbie Harry, Burt Reynolds, Ali MacGraw, and Village People's Randy Jones, among others to the club. Other celebrity sightings included Tom Cruise, Liza Minnelli, Michael Jackson, Pia Zadora, Shannon Tweed, Gene Simmons, Rick Springfield and Mamie Van Doren, to name but a few. The club also served as a location for Hal Ashby's film The Slugger's Wife (1985), which starred Rebecca De Mornay.

In 1983, when Gatien relocated to New York to open another Limelight club, his brother Maurice managed the Atlanta club. Maurice reportedly had less talent for running a nightclub than Gatien. "Peter was the brains behind the operation," according to house photographer and publicist Guy D'Alema. "Maurice ... didn't want to spend a dime and didn't have a creative bone in his body." The Atlanta club was located next to a 24-hour Kroger grocery store, which became known widely as "Disco Kroger."

In July 2010, several former Limelight employees – including Randy Easterling, Jim Redford, Noel Aguirre, and Aron Siegel – along with a few of their regular customer dancers – including Jonathan Spanier and Bret Roberts – produced "One More Night at the Limelight", a 30th Anniversary Party, at The Buckhead Theatre, formerly The Roxy Theatre. Due to the party's success and great attendance, combined with the untimely death of one of its organizers (Spanier), the remaining team produced another party, "Limelight Revisited: Déjà vu Discotheque", on August 6, 2011, at Center Stage Atlanta in midtown Atlanta.

Chicago location
The Limelight in Chicago was housed in the former home of the Chicago Historical Society; the building itself is a historic structure. It was opened in 1985, and became Excalibur nightclub in 1989. The steps to the entrance led to a hallway lined with museum cases which housed carnival like models dancing and generally moving about.  There were several levels to the club.  The main dance floor had a stage for the DJ.  There were several private rooms that often played host to a bevy of celebrities both in music and in sports.  The alternative music scene was critical at the Limelight as it played late into the 5 a.m. hour in Chicago on Saturday nights.

London location
From 1985, the Limelight in London was located in a former Welsh Presbyterian church on Shaftesbury Avenue, just off Cambridge Circus, which dates from the 1890s. The London club's decline in popularity led to the club being sold as a going concern, eventually being taken over in 2003 by Australian pub chain The Walkabout, which converted it into a sports bar. In 2013 the Walkabout eventually ceased trading and the premises is empty and awaiting conversion to a new performing arts use by the charity Stone Nest.

New York City location

The Beginning 
 
The club in New York City, situated on Sixth Avenue at West 20th Street, was the most significant and infamous of all the Limelight locations. It opened in November 1983 and was designed by Ari Bahat. The site is a former Episcopal Church of the Holy Communion. The church was a Gothic Revival brownstone building which was built in 1844-1845 and designed by architect Richard Upjohn. In the early 1970s, when the parish merged with two others, the church was deconsecrated and sold to Odyssey House, a drug rehabilitation program. Amidst financial hardship, Odyssey House sold it to Gatien in 1982. He was deeply interested in art and architecture, so he thought the church would be perfect as a club. Spending close to five million dollars on renovation, the ceilings stretched four stories over the main dance floor, there were five staircases from the main chamber to numerous lounges that hosted a different crowd in each room, cloves, VIP rooms, and the chapel area where experimental parties would be thrown to test out the popularity of such event. The New York Limelight originally started as a disco and rock club. In the 1990s, it became a prominent place to hear techno, goth, and industrial music. The club was attractive to the people of NYC because it was inclusive; goths, drag queens, rockers, leather boys, and socialites could all be seen partying with each other in one night. There were approximately fifteen thousand people showing up to the Limelight per night. During this time, Peter Gatien was named the Club King.

The Trial 
In October 1995, the club was raided by NYPD, but they were only able to make three small arrests of marijuana dealers because Gatien had been tipped off. The Limelight was temporarily locked up for a week after Gatien paid a thirty thousand dollar fine and posted a one hundred sixty thousand dollar bond. In 1996, club kid and party promoter Michael Alig was arrested and later convicted for the killing and dismemberment of Angel Melendez, a fellow member of the Club Kids and a drug dealer who frequented the club.  The Limelight was closed by the police, and subsequently reopened several times during the 1990s. In 1998, Gatien was put on trial for selling drugs within his chain of clubs. However, his lawyer Ben Brafman claimed that the eighty page affidavit used to arrest Gatien contained no proof that directly linked him to drug distribution at the clubs. He also  argued that is was "selective prosecution" due to the fact that Gatien ran such a huge operation, he could not be held individually/personally responsible for isolated pockets of drug dealing.

The End 
Assistant U.S. Attorney, Eric Friendberg, called the Limelight "a drug supermarket" where "massive amounts" of ecstasy as well as cocaine, special k, and rohypnol were used as "promotional tools to lure patrons to the club." In the end, the government agreed on not accusing Gatien of personally selling drugs or profiting from the dealers operating in his clubs. They argued that he allowed drug dealers into his venues to advertise and increase popularity, therefore pleading him not guilty.

In September 2003, it reopened under the name "Avalon"; however, it closed its doors permanently in 2007. Since May 2010, the building has been in use as the Limelight Marketplace, but in 2014 it was converted into an outlet of the David Barton Gym chain. On December 21, 2016, this location as well as all four other David Barton Gym locations in NYC abruptly closed their door for business. In June 2017, it reopened as Limelight Fitness.

2011 documentary
In April 2011, Rakontur released Limelight at the Tribeca Film Festival. The documentary's world rights were bought by Magnolia Pictures. The documentary, which highlights the club's history during the Gatien era, was produced by Gatien's daughter, Jen, and directed by Billy Corben.

In popular culture
The New York location was the site of Shirley MacLaine's New Age-themed 50th pre-birthday party, and was mentioned in her book Dancing in the Light.
 The New York location was the subject of the 1985 song "This Disco (Used to be a Cute Cathedral)" by singer Steve Taylor. The song's lyrics mentions the club's name and history.  It included on On The Fritz album. A live version appears on his album,  Limelight.
 The New York location was mentioned and depicted in the second season premiere of Miami Vice, "Prodigal Son", on September 27, 1985.
 The club was mentioned in The Horrorist's track "One Night in New York City".
 LIMELIGHT ... in a sixtieth of a second, a photography book by Guy D'Alema was released in April 2012, visually documents the early years of the Atlanta location.
 "Hush Hush", a first season episode of The Carrie Diaries, takes place at the Limelight New York in 1984.
 A parody of the club, called "Slimelight", appeared in the first issue of the comic book 22 Brides.
 The New York city location appears in Episode 6, Season 8 of The Venture Bros. where Shore Leave escorts Hank and Dean Venture. They lament the fact that it has become a mall.
 Basic Instinct (1992) includes a nightclub scene with Sharon Stone and Michael Douglas filmed, in Burbank, on a studio set inspired by the club's New York location.
 The novel "Christ Like" by Emanuel Xavier features a gay NYC nightclub called The Sanctuary which is actually The Limelight.

Notable performers

Roy Harter

 2nd Nature
 50 Cent
 Alice in Chains
 And Also the Trees
 Laurie Anderson
 Aphex Twin
 Aphrodite
 Jellybean Benitez
 Chuck Berry
 Black Label Society
 Black Uhuru
 Leigh Bowery
 Boy George
 Chris Brown
 Cabaret Voltaire
 Cab Calloway
 Cheap Trick
 Clipse
 Corrosion of Conformity
 Jayne County
 The Cramps
 Margot Day
 Dead or Alive
 Deee-Lite
 DragonForce
 Dream Theater
 Gloria Estefan
 Fabolous
 Fat Joe
 Karen Finley
 Fishbone
 Ace Frehley
 Guns N' Roses
 Nina Hagen
 Rob Halford
 Marvin Hamlisch
 Hawkwind
 Lee Hazlewood
 Whitney Houston
 Interpol
 Jermaine Jackson
 Jane's Addiction
 David Johansen
 Grace Jones
 Jesus Jones
 Jim Jones
 R. Kelly
 Patti LaBelle
 Lady Bunny
 Cyndi Lauper
 Amanda Lepore
 Lloyd
 Lords of Acid
 Lynch Mob
 Manic Street Preachers
 Mantissa
 Marilyn Manson
 Marilyn
 Mario
 Meat Beat Manifesto
 Milli Vanilli
 Mims
 Missing Persons
 Morbid Angel
 Lorin Morgan-Richards
 Anita Morris
 Morrissey
 Mötley Crüe
 Motörhead
 Peter Murphy
 Stas Namin
 The New York Dolls
 Ne-Yo
 Nitzer Ebb
 Nudeswirl
 Ozzy Osbourne
 Pigface
 The Pain Teens
 Pearl Jam
 The Prodigy
 Real McCoy
 Sharon Redd
 Rich Boy
 Rollins Band
 RuPaul
 Robin S.
 Sasha
 Joe Satriani
 Jean Shepherd
 Nancy Sinatra
 Sleep
 Slipknot
 Britney Spears
 Sylvester
 James St. James
 Larry Tee
 They Might Be Giants
 Thirty Seconds to Mars
 Evelyn Thomas
 Thompson Twins
 Johnny Thunders
 Tiny Lights
 Tool
 Liz Torres
 Transvision Vamp
 Barbara Tucker
 Susan Tyrrell
 Mamie Van Doren
 Cherry Vanilla
 Warrant
 Crystal Waters
 The Weather Girls
 White Zombie
 Holly Woodlawn
 You You You
 Pia Zadora

See also
 Church of the Holy Communion and Buildings
 Palladium (club)
 Tunnel (New York nightclub)
 Superclub

References
Notes

Bibliography
 Owen, Frank. (2003) Clubland: The Fabulous Rise and Murderous Fall of Club Culture, St. Martin's Press,   (UK title Clubland Confidential, Ebury Press)

External links
 
 Limelight on the Internet Movie Database

Nightclubs in Hallandale Beach, Florida
Nightclubs in Manhattan
Nightclubs in Chicago
Nightclubs in Georgia (U.S. state)
Nightclubs in London
Electronic dance music venues